Wu Hang (Chinese: 吴航; pinyin: Wú Háng; born 1 February 1993 in Cangnan) is a Chinese footballer who currently plays for Wuxi Wugou in the China League Two.

Club career
Wu started his professional football career in 2011 when he was sent to China League Two club Wenzhou Provenza (Hangzhou Greentown youth team) for the 2011 China League Two campaign. He was promoted to Hangzhou Greentown's first team squad by Takeshi Okada in 2012. On 7 April 2012, he made his Chinese Super League debut in the fifth match of the season which Hangzhou Greentown tied with Shanghai Shenhua 1–1, coming on as a substitute for Renatinho in the 79th minute.
On 1 July 2015, Wu transferred to China League Two side Baotou Nanjiao.

In November 2016, Wu moved to Super League side Shanghai SIPG on a free transfer.  He was sent to the SIPG reserved team in 2018. On 2 March 2019, Wu was loaned to China League Two side Jilin Baijia for the 2019 season. On his return to Shanghai SIPG he was sent to the reserves until he joined Xinjiang Tianshan Leopard on 13 April 2021.

Career statistics 
Statistics accurate as of match played 31 December 2020.

References

External links
 

1993 births
Living people
Sportspeople from Wenzhou
Chinese footballers
Footballers from Zhejiang
Zhejiang Professional F.C. players
Shanghai Port F.C. players
Chinese Super League players
China League Two players
Association football defenders